London Pride is a sculpture by the British artist Frank Dobson located on Queen's Walk on London's South Bank. The sculpture was given Grade II listed status in January 2016. The sculpture depicts two nude women, it sits on a slate platform, with an inscription carved by David Kindersley in front of the piece that reads:

Dobson intended for the bowl in one of the figure's hands to be planted with Saxifraga urbium, commonly known as London Pride.

References

External links
 

1951 sculptures
1987 sculptures
1987 establishments in England
1987 in London
Bronze sculptures in the United Kingdom
Grade II listed buildings in the London Borough of Lambeth
Grade II listed public art
Nude sculptures in the United Kingdom
Outdoor sculptures in London
Sculptures of women in the United Kingdom
Women in London